Faiakes is a former municipality on the island of Corfu, Ionian Islands, Greece. Since the 2019 local government reform it is part of the municipality Central Corfu and Diapontia Islands, of which it is a municipal unit. It is located in the northeastern part of the island of Corfu. It has a land area of 53.850 km² and a population of 6,545 (2011 census). The seat of the municipality was the town of Ypsos (pop. 590). Its largest towns are Káto Korakiána (pop. 967), Áno Korakiána (946), Ýpsos, Káto Ágios Márkos (867), and Spartýlas (517).

References

Populated places in Corfu (regional unit)